The 1981 Peach Bowl was a post-season college football bowl game between the West Virginia Mountaineers and the Florida Gators.  The game took place on December 31, 1981, resulting in a West Virginia win over Florida 26–6.  The offensive MVP was Mickey Walczack of West Virginia and the defensive MVP was West Virginia's Don Stemple.

Florida coach Charley Pell was so disappointed by his team's performance that he burned the game film and buried it in the Gators' practice field.

References

Peach Bowl
Peach Bowl
Florida Gators football bowl games
West Virginia Mountaineers football bowl games
1981 in sports in Georgia (U.S. state)
December 1981 sports events in the United States